The Basin may refer to several places:
 The Basin, New South Wales, a suburb of Sydney, Australia
 The Basin, Victoria, an outer eastern suburb of Melbourne, Australia
 The Basin (Rottnest Island), Western Australia
 The Basin, a geologic feature within Franconia Notch State Park in New Hampshire, United States
 Basin Reserve, a cricket ground in Wellington, New Zealand

See also
 Basin (disambiguation)